Aporosa acuminata is a species of plant in the family Phyllanthaceae. It is endemic to Western Ghats of India and Sri Lanka. It is an understory tree with 5m tall. Flowers are unisexual and dioecious, where male flowers are green to white in color. Reddish capsular fruits are one-seeded.

Common names
 Tamil: Neervetti, nirvetti
 Malayalam: Nirvetti, nirvittil

References

 India Biodiversity
 The Plant List
 New Species subspecies varieties discovered

Flora of Sri Lanka
Flora of India (region)
acuminata
Plants described in 1861